Habronattus dossenus is a species of jumping spider in the family Salticidae. It is found in Mexico. They are most well known for their unique dynamic signals such as scraping, thumping, buzzing, and/or buzzing. It has been shown that there is a strong correlation between their seismic (vibration) signals and motion signals, suggesting that H. dossenus utilize inter-signal interactions to create integrative communication. These seismic signals can range from rapid phasic sounds that are less than 200 milliseconds long to long phrases lasting multiple seconds.

References

Further reading

External links

 

Salticidae
Articles created by Qbugbot
Spiders described in 1987